= Giants, Monsters & Dragons =

2001 encyclopedia of mythology

Giants, Monsters & Dragons: An Encyclopedia of Folklore, Legend, and Myth
- Author: Carol Rose
- Subject: Folklore, Legend, Mythology, Monsters, Dragons
- Publisher: W. W. Norton
- Publication place: United States
- English publication date: 2001
- Pages: 428
- ISBN: 0-393-32211-4
- OCLC: 48798119

Giants, Monsters & Dragons: An Encyclopedia of Folklore, Legend and Myth is an encyclopedia of monsters, folklore, myths, and legends compiled by Carol Rose. The book features small entries about monsters, folklore, myths and legends from around the world, and includes many illustrations.
